The 2022–23 Texas A&M–Commerce Lions women's basketball team represents the Texas A&M University–Commerce in the 2022–23 NCAA Division I women's basketball season. The Lions, led by ninth-year head coach Jason Burton, play their home games at Texas A&M–Commerce Field House in Commerce, Texas, as members of the Southland Conference.

This season marks Texas A&M–Commerce's first year of a four-year transition period from Division II to Division I. As a result, the Lions are not eligible for NCAA postseason play until 2026-27 season.

Previous season
The Lions finished the 2021-22 season ranked 15th in the Division II Sports Information Directors' rankings and 18th in the Women's Basketball Coaches association Poll.  They had a 27-5 record overall.  The Lions had a 12-3 conference record in Lone Star Conference play for a second place finish.  They fell to West Texas A&M in the conference tournament finals.  The Lions were selected to participate in the 2022 NCAA Division II women's basketball tournament.  They had an 80–74 first round win over Colorado School of Mines in the South Central regionals.  Their season ended with a 67–69 second round loss to Lubbock Christian.

Preseason polls

Southland Conference Poll
The Southland Conference released its preseason poll on October 25, 2022. Receiving one first place vote, the Lions were picked to finish fifth in the conference.

Preseason All Conference
In Texas A&M–Commerce's initial Southland Conference season, Dyani Robinson was selected to the Preseason All Conference second team.

Roster

Schedule and results

|-
!colspan=9 style=| Non-conference exhibition season

|-
!colspan=9 style=| Non-conference regular season

|-
!colspan=9 style=| Southland Conference regular season

|-
!colspan=9 style=| 2023 Jersey Mike's Subs Southland Basketball Tournament
|-

Source:

See also
2022–23 Texas A&M–Commerce Lions men's basketball team

References

Texas A&M–Commerce Lions women's basketball seasons
Texas AandM-Commerce Lions
Texas AandM-Commerce Lions women's basketball
Texas AandM-Commerce Lions women's basketball